Dominion Chalmers United Church is a large United church, located in downtown Ottawa, at the corner of Cooper and O'Connor Streets (with access from Lisgar Street). It is a 1962 merger of two key congregations from both the Methodist and Presbyterian traditions, each possessing lengthy histories.

History
Chalmers Presbyterian/United Church, was originally Bank Street Canada Presbyterian Church, located on nearby Bank Street at Slater Street from 1866 to 1914. Alexander Cowper Hutchinson (architect) designed the Bank Street Presbyterian Church at Bank Street at Slater Street in 1868.

The Bank Street Presbyterian Church building was reconstructed by the architect William Hodgson in 1881 after a fire. Alexander Cowper Hutchinson designed the  Bank Street Presbyterian Sunday School in 1890.

The Bank Street Presbyterian Church was renamed after Thomas Chalmers, a leader of the 1843 disruption in the Church of Scotland that led to the formation of the Free Church, and in Ottawa, their "parent" congregation of Knox Presbyterian, is now located just two blocks east on Lisgar at Elgin Street. Alexander Cowper Hutchinson designed the Chalmers Presbyterian Church on O'Connor Street at Cooper Street, 1912–1914.

The Metcalfe Street building was built in 1830 as Metcalfe Street Methodist. In 1852 this group merged with those from Rideau Street, and the building was enlarged and renamed The Dominion in 1876. The Dominion Methodist Church, which was located on Metcalfe Street at Queen Street, was designed by the architect Henry Hodge Horsey and built between 1875–1876. The Dominion Methodist plaque lists Alexis Helmer, whose death was the inspiration for John McCrae's poem, "In Flanders Fields".

The building was destroyed in a fire in February 1961.

The Dominion Methodist/United Church's roots go back to Methodist circuit riders visitations in Hull, Lower Canada from 1816, and a wooden structure built on Rideau Street in the Lower Town in 1827.

The Dominion-Chalmers (or DC Church) buildings have recently undergone major renovations to their large sanctuary (damaged by a fire in 1955), and is used for concerts; and for other special events, sometimes of a national nature.

The Carleton Dominion-Chalmers Centre
In 2018, Carleton University purchased the church building as a performance space, though the congregation will continue to use the building for religious services as well. After its repossession, it was officially renamed the Carleton Dominion-Chalmers Centre, although it is sometimes incorrectly referred to as the amalgamated Carleton Dominion-Chalmers United Centre, with Mara Brown being announced as this extension's first director on April 1, effective April 15. Prior to this appointment, on March 26, 2019, the university held a festival of life celebration for Professor Pius Adesanmi, Director of Carleton's Institute of African Studies; one of 18 Canadian persons to have died in a tragic plane crash on March 10.

References

External links
 
 History

United Church of Canada churches in Ottawa